The Boston District Independents were formed in 2012, by the four remaining Boston Bypass Independent councillors on Boston Borough Council. They are Councillors Alison Austin, Richard Austin, Helen Staples and David Witts.

Electoral performance

Frampton and Holme By-Election, 18 October 2012
Caused by the resignation of Independent Councillor Brian Rush (formerly a member of the Boston Bypass Independents). The Boston District Independents declined to stand and instead assisted another Independent candidate, Maggie Peberdy who came second with 139 votes or 26.7%.

Group Reorganisation
At Boston Borough Council's Annual General Meeting in May 2013, the group was reconstituted as "Independent Group 2".

Leaders
 2011 - 2012: Cllr Helen Staples
 2012 - 2013: Cllr David Witts

References

Political parties established in 2012
Locally based political parties in England
Politics of Lincolnshire
2012 establishments in England
Boston, Lincolnshire